Buckhorn is an unincorporated community in Austin County, in the U.S. state of Texas. According to the Handbook of Texas, its population was 20 in 2000. It is located within the Greater Houston metropolitan area.

History
The area in what is now known as Buckhorn today was first settled in the 1830s. The community was founded in 1873 when a cotton gin and gristmill were built on the banks of a Caney Creek tributary by HS Smith. A post office was established at Buckhorn in 1874 and remained in operation until 1901. N. Cochran was the first postmaster. It had several churches and a stagecoach that bypassed the town semiweekly toward Bellville in 1880. It had a population of 200 in 1885. This dropped below 100 by 1910 and continued to plunge to 10 by 1933. It grew to 50 residents and had two businesses in 1939. Its population went down to 20 from 1974 through 2000. Two churches named Samuel and Washam Chapels were in Buckhorn in the late 1980s.

Geography

Education
Buckhorn had its own school in 1880. It had 21 students enrolled in 1918. Today, the community is served by the Bellville Independent School District.

References

Unincorporated communities in Austin County, Texas
Unincorporated communities in Texas